The Austen Riggs Center is a psychiatric treatment facility in Stockbridge, Massachusetts. It was founded by Austen Fox Riggs in 1913 as the Stockbridge Institute for the Study and Treatment of Psychoneuroses before being renamed in honor of Austen Riggs on July 21, 1919.

History

Founding to 1946

A New York City internist who repaired to Stockbridge, MA while suffering from tuberculosis, Austen Fox Riggs developed a treatment regimen that both anticipated the rise of psychosomatic medicine and therapeutic psychology, and forged a new direction for residential care.

Riggs was influenced by the mental hygiene movement (also known as the social hygiene movement). He developed his residential model after observing a physician in Bethel, Maine named John George Gehring, who treated patients through strict daily regimens and treatments through suggestion.

Opened in 1913 as The Stockbridge Institute for the Study and Treatment of the Psychoneuroses, the Institute incorporated in 1919 as the Austen Riggs Foundation. Riggs grew quickly; it had 100 patients by 1924, with average stays of four to six weeks. A staff of doctors handled no more than 10 patients each, and physicians in training joined regular staff meetings and conferences. A series of "green books" summed up Riggs's "precepts for successful living" and an associate from the 1930s said that patients were encouraged to be "a valuable member of a united team." Patients included socially prominent figures such as Ruth Wales du Pont, who spent three weeks at the institution in 1924.

Riggs had what a colleague described as a "deep and almost Puritanic conviction that feeling must be kept under constant surveillance and control by doing." His hospital had an occupational therapy shop equipped for weaving, carpentry, painting, and other handicrafts, and rooms for games and recreation. Riggs also had what he called "10 commandments" of successful living.

Though he denounced what he called Freud's "mental gymnastics," and criticized the Vienna doctors' emphasis on sexual conflicts as the root of neurosis, Riggs's practices bore commonalities with the emerging field of psychoanalysis. He believed neurotics to be troubled by the "residues of past experience," and that they would heal in part by self-knowledge and adaptation to practical realities. Where Freud spoke of defense mechanisms, Riggs once said that a patient "cannot be deprived of the protection of his neuroses." Where Freud spoke of coming to grips with the ordinary unhappiness of the world, Riggs spoke of the problem of "magnifying suffering by making a personal quarrel with pain." The American Journal of Psychiatry has called Riggs' system "a fully integrated conceptual system of ego psychology" that preceded Sigmund Freud's attention to the field by ten years. Riggs also read Freud in the original German, as well as Pierre Janet and Jean-Martin Charcot in French.

Riggs's books included Play: Recreation In a Balanced Life, Intelligent Living and Just Nerves. The New York Times described him as an "internationally known psychiatrist" who was "widely known to the general public for his books."

1947–1967
In 1947, Dr. Robert P. Knight, the former chief of staff of the Menninger Foundation came to Riggs as medical director. A friend of Anna Freud's and well known in the burgeoning world of American psychoanalysis, Knight emphasized talk therapy and rehabilitation, and avoided common practices in psychiatric hospitals of the time, including electroshock, insulin coma, and lobotomy. Knight regarded medications as useful to "lessen distress, improve the patient's behavior and increase his accessibility to psychotherapy," but believed that ultimately a patient's troubles "must be worked out in treatment, if it is ever to be worked out at all."

A president of both the American Psychiatric Association and the American Psychoanalytic Foundation, Knight was an authority on borderline personality disorder, which he said referred to patients who were "quite sick but not frankly psychotic." Under his direction Austen Riggs began to receive more seriously ill patients, and to explore ways to put into practice Knight's ideas that borderline patients needed a combination of structure and freedom in order to negotiate their own path toward health.

Early in Knight's tenure, when, facing some turmoil with a younger patient population, he convened a conference of patients and staff to work out philosophy and procedures of a therapeutic community.

By 1948, Knight had brought with him what the scholar Lawrence J. Friedman has called "the creative core of Menninger's clinical psychology department and its research staff," including David Rapaport, Roy Schafer, and Merton Gill (who wrote the text Diagnostic Psychological Testing) and Margaret Brenman-Gibson, the first non-physician to receive full clinical and research psychoanalytic training in the United States

In 1951, Erik Erikson joined the staff at Riggs, completing a team that, according to an article in the Harvard Gazette, "turned the grand experiment of treating very troubled patients in an open therapeutic community into a Golden Age of conceptual and clinical inventiveness." According to Friedman, Erikson "compared Riggs to the safe sanitarium in the Alps that Thomas Mann had characterized in The Magic Mountain."

During the Eriksons' residence in Stockbridge, Joan Erikson, an artist and dancer, directed the Riggs' Activities Program, which she expanded to include theater, dance, painting, sculpture, woodwork, gardening, and music. She also founded a formal Montessori kindergarten for local families, in which Riggs' patients could apprentice—a program that continues today. According to Erikson biographer Daniel Burston, the Activities Program "became a unique, engrossing, and deeply healing experience for patients, which stood in stark contrast to the enforced passivity, boredom, and/or utter self-absorption that prevails in many treatment settings."

The theater program at Austen Riggs was also influenced by William Gibson, the playwright known for The Miracle Worker. While in Stockbridge, Gibson wrote a novel called The Cobweb, set at a psychiatric hospital, which was turned into a film starring Richard Widmark and Lauren Bacall.

Erikson pointed out that the Activities Program played a major role in preventing patients from succumbing to a narrow, negative identity produced by immersion in the "patient role." He credited his wife's work with teaching him the "curative as well as creative role of work," which he found to be prominent in the life of Martin Luther.

Erikson also used his experience at Riggs to pursue the ideas he developed in his book Childhood and Society, which proposed a series of eight normative crises in every life, with potential at each stage for healthy growth and integration—and also pathologic development and mental illness.

1967–1991
In 1967, after Knight's death, Dr. Otto Allen Will, Jr., formerly of Chestnut Lodge, came to direct Austen Riggs and brought his understanding of early attachment problems and psychotic vulnerability to the treatment program. According to his New York Times obituary, "Dr. Will was one of a small number of psychoanalysts who devoted their careers to trying to understand psychotic patients through long, intensive, therapeutic relationships with them." The Times noted that Will wrote in more than 85 papers how psychotic thought states might be changed using only psychotherapy. Will retired in 1978 as medical director at Austen Riggs but continued on the hospital's board until his death.

Dr. Daniel P. Schwartz, the former director of the Yale psychiatric hospital, directed Austen Riggs from 1978 to 1991, and oversaw the hospital in an era in which both managed care and biological psychiatry came to dominate the field, and in which many hospitals focusing on long-term psychotherapy – including Chestnut Lodge, the McLean Hospital, the Westchester Division of New York-Presbyterian Hospital, Timberlawn, Sheppard Pratt, and Menninger's—changed their missions.

It was during this time (1985–1988) that Christopher Bollas, PhD, a leading voice in contemporary psychoanalytic theory, served as director of education at the Austen Riggs Center.

1991–2011
In 1991, Edward R. Shapiro assumed the role of medical director/CEO of Austen Riggs. An authority on family and organizational systems, Shapiro expanded Riggs' focus on working with family members to facilitate patients' treatment, and increased the number of social workers on staff from one to eight. Shapiro also emphasized Riggs as a resource for "treatment resistant" individuals, who were unable to be treated successfully elsewhere.

Under Shapiro's leadership, Riggs increased its residential capacity and expanded the options for more cost-effective step-down programs. Shapiro retired in June, 2011.

2011–2015
Donald Rosen, MD was appointed as medical director/CEO in July 2011. After Rosen's departure from the center in March 2013, Dr. James L. Sacksteder assumed the role of medical director/CEO of Austen Riggs. A board-certified psychiatrist, Dr. Sacksteder began his career at the Austen Riggs Center as a Fellow in psychiatry and served the bulk of his time as director of patient care. He served Riggs for four decades culminating as the organization's leader.

Dr. Sacksteder wrote over twenty articles and book chapters on the treatment of anorexia nervosa, long-term psychoanalytically-oriented psychotherapy of severely disturbed patients, narcissism, object relations theory, and ego psychology. He is co-editor of Attachment in the Therapeutic Process with Daniel P. Schwartz, M.D. and Yoshiharu Akabane, M.D.: (International University Press, 1987). Dr. Sacksteder was a lecturer at Smith College School of Social Work for over twenty years. Sacksteder retired in June, 2015.

2015–2018
Andrew J. Gerber, MD, PhD, became the medical director/CEO at the Austen Riggs Center In July 2015. Prior to coming to Riggs, he served as the director of the Magnetic Resonance Imaging Research Program at the New York State Psychiatric Institute, the director of research at the Columbia University Center for Psychoanalytic Training and Research and an assistant professor of psychiatry in the Division of Child and Adolescent Psychiatry at Columbia University Medical Center. Dr. Gerber also had a private psychoanalytic practice while in New York. During his tenure at Austen Riggs, Dr. Gerber was instrumental in establishing several strategic initiatives in areas including human development, suicide research and education.

2018–present

Eric Plakun, a psychiatrist at the Austen Riggs Center for more than 40 years, was named Medical Director/CEO in November 2018. Plakun previously served as an expert witness in the 2019 Wit v. United Behavioral Health class-action suit.

In 2019, the Austen Riggs Center marked the centennial year of its founding. It partnered with the Norman Rockwell Museum on an exhibition about the relationship between Rockwell and Erik Erikson, opened an exhibition on its history and the history of mental health care in America, and convened an international conference on the mental health crisis in America.

Other notable staff
Marilyn Charles, 2014–2015 President of the American Psychological Association's Division 39 (Psychoanalysis) is a member of the therapy staff at Austen Riggs.

Treatment approach
At a time of rapid decrease in psychotherapy—just 29 percent of office-based visits to psychiatrists involved psychotherapy in 2004–2005, down from 44 percent in 1996–1997—the Austen Riggs Center organizes its treatment around intensive psychodynamic psychotherapy with a clinical psychologist or psychiatrist four times weekly. Riggs maintains a long-term residential treatment model in an era of managed care that emphasizes short-term hospitalizations and outpatient treatment for the seriously mentally ill. In 2008 a meta-review of 23 studies reported in the Journal of the American Medical Association. indicated that psychotherapy, given as often as three times a week, relieved symptoms including anxiety and borderline personality disorder better than many shorter-term therapies. Though medication is administered to a vast majority of Riggs' patients, Riggs follows the principles of "psychodynamic psychopharmacology," which pays attention to the demonstrated ways in which relationships between patients and mental health professionals impact the efficacy of medication.

Riggs provides an open and voluntary program. The minimum stay is six weeks and the median stay is six months. Following the reorganization of the Menninger Foundation in 2003, The New York Times described Riggs as the last of the "elite private hospitals," where patients can spend "months or years sorting out their lives" with treatment including intensive, long-term psychotherapy.

The Austen Riggs Center focuses its attention on individuals with serious mental illnesses for whom repeated treatments in outpatient settings have proved ineffective.

Erikson Institute
The Erikson Institute for Education and Research, an integral part of the Austen Riggs Center named for Erik Erikson, was founded in 1994. The Erikson Institute hosts scholars in residence, holds conferences and lectures, supports clinical research, and helps to facilitate community engagement (such as film screenings and roundtable discussions) and organizational partnerships. The Erikson Institute also offers a four-year fellowship in psychoanalytic psychotherapy and manages the Austen Fox Riggs Library, a collection of 18,000 items of scholarly interest. Dr. Jane G. Tillman is currently the Evelyn Stefansson Nef Director of the Erikson Institute.

The Erikson Institute awards the Erikson Institute Prize for Excellence in Mental Health Media annually "to recognize and encourage writers, journalists, and media experts who have produced sophisticated and accessible work on mental health issues." The prize has been awarded since 2010, and winners present at the Erikson Institute Prize Colloquy, which happens annually at the centre. Past winners have included artist Alison Bechdel, writer Andrew Solomon and radio journalist Alix Spiegel.

References

External links

 Austen Riggs Center on GuideStar

1913 establishments in Massachusetts
Hospitals established in 1913
Psychiatric hospitals in Massachusetts
Stockbridge, Massachusetts
Austen Riggs Center